Prorella ochrocarneata is a moth in the family Geometridae first described by James Halliday McDunnough in 1949. It is found in the US state of Arizona.

The wingspan is about 17 mm. The forewings are light fleshy ocherous. The terminal area is of a deeper shade than the remainder of the wing, forming a narrow terminal band, rather even in character. The hindwings are paler with a small smoky patch at the base of the wing. Adults have been recorded on wing in August.

References

Moths described in 1949
Eupitheciini